Never Too Late is the sixth and final album by the American singer-songwriter Jimi Jamison, released on November 2, 2012 by Frontiers Records. The album is produced by Erik Martensson, who also co-wrote all the songs. Jamison's daughter Lacy E. Jamison is on backing vocals in "Heaven Call Your Name" and there is a Japanese bonus track, the acoustic version of "Everybody's Got a Broken Heart".

Track listing

Personnel 

 Jimi Jamison - Lead vocals
 Erik Mårtensson - Backing vocals, bass, keyboards, lead and rhythm guitars
 Jonas Öijvall - Analog synthesizers, Hammond B3 and piano 
 Magnus Henriksson - Lead guitar
 Magnus Ulfstedt - Drums

References 

2012 albums
Jimi Jamison albums